Pseudagris is an Afrotropical genus of large potter wasps, formerly treated as a subgenus within Synagris.

Species 
 Pseudagris albicauda (Schulthess, 1923)
 Pseudagris aterrima (Maidl, 1914)
 Pseudagris brunnea Gusenleitner, 2007
 Pseudagris carinata (Saussure, 1863)
 Pseudagris hirsuta (Gusenleitner, 2007)
 Pseudagris junodiana (Schulthess, 1899)
 Pseudagris pygmaea Gusenleitner, 1998
 Pseudagris versicolor (Schulthess, 1914)

References

Potter wasps
Hymenoptera genera